State Trunk Highway 441, and also called the Tri-County Expressway or Highway 441 (STH-441, or WIS 441) is a state highway in the US state of Wisconsin. Together with Interstate 41/US Highway 41 (I-41/US 41), the highway forms a beltway around the greater Appleton area, and is a freeway for the entire length of its route. It connects at both ends to its parent highway, I-41/US 41. It runs east–west and north–south in east central Wisconsin from near Neenah around Appleton to near Little Chute through Winnebago, Outagamie and Calumet counties. The Roland Kampo Memorial Bridge spans Little Lake Butte des Morts near the highway's southwest terminus.

History

The Roland Kampo Memorial Bridge was the first portion of this road completed; traffic began flowing on the bridge at 11 a.m. on November 30, 1975. The bridge was also the last portion of the Tri-County Expressway completed for more than a decade, with the remainder of the expressway mired in the proposal stage. The exits on the portion not concurrent with US 10 were unsigned until 2019, when they were numbered to reflect 441's mileage.

The bridge was given a state highway designation (WIS 441) in the 1980s, with signs installed circa 1986. Movement to complete the full  of freeway began in the late 1980s, and the first new stretch of freeway since 1975 was completed in November 1991, extending from CTH-P to US 10 (Oneida Street). The entire freeway length was completed in September 1993.

Between 2012 and 2019, the Wisconsin Department of Transportation (WisDOT) worked to a widen the roadway from east of I-41 to west of Calumet Street from four to six lanes along with upgrades of interchanges along the section. A large part of the work was completing the road's southeast interchange with I-41 (Mike Ellis Interchange) by restoring missing ramps, adding auxiliary lanes to I-41, and upgrading the Kampo Memorial Bridge. Property was also acquired to allow the smoothing of two sharp curves from the Kampo Bridge to north of Midway Road.
As part of the project, the existing interchange with Oneida Street was converted to a diverging diamond interchange, the first in northern Wisconsin.

Exit list

See also

References

External links

WI 441 Terminus Photos
Project info from Wisconsin DOT

441
Freeways in the United States
Transportation in Winnebago County, Wisconsin
Transportation in Calumet County, Wisconsin
Transportation in Outagamie County, Wisconsin